Arcadia is a village in Valley County, Nebraska, United States. The population was 311 at the 2010 census.

History
Arcadia was platted in 1885 when it was certain that the railroad would soon be extended to that point. The name was apparently chosen by the postmaster, Sarah Coulter Hawthorne, in 1874 in reference to the wild roses which were common to the area as she mistakenly believed the name to mean "feast of flowers."

Geography
Arcadia is located at  (41.423839, -99.124752).

Demographics

2010 census
As of the census of 2010, there were 311 people, 138 households, and 91 families living in the village. The racial makeup of the village was 98.7% White, 0.3% Native American, 0.3% Asian, and 0.6% from two or more races. Hispanic or Latino of any race were 2.9% of the population.

There were 138 households, of which 29.0% had children under the age of 18 living with them, 56.5% were married couples living together, 5.1% had a female householder with no husband present, 4.3% had a male householder with no wife present, and 34.1% were non-families. 31.9% of all households were made up of individuals, and 21.7% had someone living alone who was 65 years of age or older. The average household size was 2.25 and the average family size was 2.78.

The median age in the village was 46.7 years. 25.1% of residents were under the age of 18; 4.2% were between the ages of 18 and 24; 17.4% were from 25 to 44; 26.5% were from 45 to 64; and 27% were 65 years of age or older. The gender makeup of the village was 48.6% male and 51.4% female.

2000 census
As of the census of 2000, there were 359 people, 155 households, and 95 families living in the village. The population density was 637.4 people per square mile (247.5/km2). There were 189 housing units at an average density of 335.6 per square mile (130.3/km2). The racial makeup of the village was 98.89% White, 0.56% African American, 0.28% Asian, and 0.28% from two or more races. Hispanic or Latino of any race were 0.84% of the population.

There were 155 households, out of which 27.1% had children under the age of 18 living with them, 56.8% were married couples living together, 2.6% had a female householder with no husband present, and 38.1% were non-families. 35.5% of all households were made up of individuals, and 24.5% had someone living alone who was 65 years of age or older. The average household size was 2.32 and the average family size was 3.04.

In the village, the population was spread out, with 27.9% under the age of 18, 5.0% from 18 to 24, 23.1% from 25 to 44, 17.0% from 45 to 64, and 27.0% who were 65 years of age or older. The median age was 40 years. For every 100 females, there were 87.0 males. For every 100 females age 18 and over, there were 85.0 males.

As of 2000 the median income for a household in the village was $24,464, and the median income for a family was $33,750. Males had a median income of $24,107 versus $20,500 for females. The per capita income for the village was $15,015. About 5.1% of families and 9.4% of the population were below the poverty line, including 11.0% of those under age 18 and 8.3% of those age 65 or over.

References

Villages in Valley County, Nebraska
Villages in Nebraska